The communauté d'agglomération Pau Béarn Pyrénées is a communauté d'agglomération in the département of Pyrénées-Atlantiques, in the Nouvelle-Aquitaine région of France. It provides a framework within which local tasks common to the 31 member communes can be carried out together. It was created in 2017 by the merger of the former communauté d'agglomération Pau-Pyrénées and the communautés de communes Gave et Coteaux and Miey de Béarn. The communauté d'agglomération is centred on the town of Pau. Its area is 343.6 km2. Its population was 161,871 in 2018, of which 76,275 in Pau proper.

Communes
The communes of the communauté d'agglomération are:

Arbus
Aressy
Artigueloutan
Artiguelouve
Aubertin
Aussevielle
Beyrie-en-Béarn
Billère
Bizanos
Bosdarros
Bougarber
Denguin
Gan
Gelos
Idron
Jurançon
Laroin
Lée
Lescar
Lons
Mazères-Lezons
Meillon
Ousse
Pau
Poey-de-Lescar
Rontignon
Saint-Faust
Sendets
Siros
Uzein
Uzos

References

External links
Official web site of the communauté d'agglomération (in French)
Official tourist information web site of the communauté d'agglomération (in English)

Pau
Pau Bearn